The Rue de l'Avenir was an electric moving walkway installed at the 1900 Exposition Universelle in Paris. It ran along the edge of the Exposition site, from the Esplanade of Les Invalides to the Champ de Mars, passing through nine stations along the way, where passengers could board. It was designed by architect Joseph Lyman Silsbee and engineer Max E. Schmidt, designers of The Great Wharf Moving Sidewalk installed at the 1893 World's Fair in Chicago, the first-ever moving walkway.

Features
The moving sidewalk was a very popular and useful attraction, given the large size of the Exposition. The sidewalks had posts with handles which passengers could hold onto, or they could walk. The fast sidewalk made it possible to complete the loop in 26 minutes. The fare was an average of fifty French franc centimes.

The sidewalk went counterclockwise along the following circle route: Esplanade des Invalides along the Rue Fabert, Le Rue des Nations along the Quai d'Orsay, the Champ de Mars along the Avenue de La Bourdonnais and the Avenue de La Motte-Picquet to connect again with the Rue Fabert. It could simultaneously accommodate 14,000 people; during the afternoon of Easter Day, it carried 70,000 people, while the busiest tram and bus lines carry little more than 40,000 passengers a day on average.

The rail track was sometimes at 7 meters high like the moving sidewalks, sometimes at ground level and sometimes underground.

Mechanism
The originality of the system of movable sidewalks, adopted for the 1900 Exhibition, lay in the fact that the propulsion components were absolutely distinct from the supporting and running components. The propulsion was provided for each sidewalk by a roller acting by friction on a beam fixed along the center line of the trucks and these were, two by two, provided with two pairs of wheels carried and guided by side rails established under the floors.

The electricity necessary for the production of the movement was supplied by the Moulineaux factory of the Compagnie de l'Ouest; the current supplied was transformed into direct current because of the ease of starting and speed adjustment it provides. This current is brought to the platforms by 9 cables and received on a distribution board which makes it possible to obtain the march in one direction or the other, or the immediate stop.

Gallery

References

Exposition Universelle (1900)
World's fair architecture in Paris
Former buildings and structures in Paris